Henry Braid Wilson (1861–1954) was a U.S. Navy admiral. Admiral Wilson may also refer to:

Arthur Wilson (Royal Navy officer) (1842–1921), British Royal Navy admiral
Barry Wilson (Royal Navy officer) (1936–2018), British Royal Navy vice admiral
Donald Erwin Wilson (1932–2002), U.S. Navy rear admiral
George Wilson (Royal Navy officer) (1756–1826), British Royal Navy admiral
Jesse A. Wilson Jr. (born 1964), U.S. Navy rear admiral
John Wilson (Royal Navy officer) (1834–1885), British Royal Navy rear admiral

See also
Russell Willson (1883–1948), U.S. Navy vice admiral